Doctor Salwa al-Jassar was one of four women elected to the National Assembly of Kuwait in the 2009 legislative election. al-Jassar is the Chief of Center for Empowering Women and ran as an independent candidate. al-Jassar obtained a Bachelor's degree in geography and economics from Kuwait University in 1980, a Master's Degree from the University of Michigan in 1987 and a PhD from the University of Pittsburgh Salwa al-Jassar has worked as a professor at Kuwait University. Salwa al-Jassar had previously authored a report on women in Kuwaiti politics with the United Nations Development Programme.

References 

Year of birth missing (living people)
Living people
Members of the National Assembly (Kuwait)
Kuwaiti women in politics
21st-century women politicians
Kuwait University alumni
University of Michigan alumni
Academic staff of Kuwait University